Erioptera is a genus of crane fly in the family Limoniidae.

Species
 Subgenus Alcheringa Theischinger, 1994
E. amabilis Alexander, 1926
 Subgenus Ctenerioptera Alexander, 1961
E. caledonia Alexander, 1948
E. derasa Edwards, 1931
E. ferruginea Brunetti, 1912
E. pectinella Alexander, 1961
E. sziladyi Alexander, 1934
 Subgenus Erioptera Meigen, 1803

E. abrasa Edwards, 1928
E. acucuspis Alexander, 1976
E. alanstonei Alexander, 1977
E. alboguttata Edwards, 1916
E. aletschina Stary, 1997
E. alta Alexander, 1932
E. andina Alexander, 1913
E. angolana Alexander, 1963
E. angusticincta Alexander, 1956
E. annulipes Williston, 1896
E. apicialba Alexander, 1921
E. badicincta Alexander, 1974
E. beckeri Kuntze, 1914
E. beebeana Alexander, 1950
E. bequaerti Alexander, 1923
E. biaculeata Savchenko, 1981
E. biarmata Alexander, 1934
E. biobtusa Alexander, 1956
E. brahma Alexander, 1966
E. brevirama Alexander, 1931
E. bryantiana Alexander, 1929
E. cacuminis Edwards, 1926
E. carior Alexander, 1920
E. carissima Alexander, 1920
E. celestissima Alexander, 1956
E. cervula Savchenko, 1972
E. chlorophylla Osten Sacken, 1860
E. chlorophylloides Alexander, 1919
E. circumambiens Alexander, 1957
E. cladophora Alexander, 1920
E. cladophoroides Alexander, 1921
E. connata Alexander, 1972
E. coolbyngga Theischinger, 1994
E. cornuta Savchenko, 1984
E. cristata Alexander, 1956
E. dama Alexander, 1958
E. dampfi Alexander, 1927
E. diplacantha Alexander, 1931
E. distinguenda Stary, 1983
E. divisa (Walker, 1848)
E. dyari Alexander, 1924
E. ebenina Alexander, 1926
E. euzona Alexander, 1970
E. flavata (Westhoff, 1882)
E. flavohumeralis Alexander, 1924
E. funesta Alexander, 1926
E. furcifer Alexander, 1919
E. fuscipennis Meigen, 1818
E. fusculenta Edwards, 1938
E. galbinocosta Alexander, 1960
E. gaspeana Alexander, 1929
E. genuatra Alexander, 1953
E. georgei Alexander, 1956
E. gorgona Savchenko, 1981
E. grandior Brunetti, 1912
E. griseipennis Meigen, 1838
E. haplostyla Alexander, 1934
E. himalayae Alexander, 1930
E. hohensis Alexander, 1949
E. horii Alexander, 1924
E. impensa Alexander, 1957
E. interrita Alexander, 1970
E. inusitata Alexander, 1976
E. juvenilis Alexander, 1933
E. karisimbii Alexander, 1956
E. kluaneana Alexander, 1955
E. laticrista Savchenko, 1977
E. leptostyla Alexander, 1940
E. leucosticta Alexander, 1933
E. limbata Loew, 1873
E. litostyla Alexander, 1966
E. longicauda Loew, 1871
E. lucerna Alexander, 1926
E. lunicola Alexander, 1932
E. lunigera Alexander, 1929
E. lutea Meigen, 1804
E. luteicornis Alexander, 1930
E. mediofusca Alexander, 1940
E. megalops Alexander, 1975
E. megophthalma Alexander, 1918
E. meijerei Edwards, 1921
E. micromyia Alexander, 1920
E. minor de Meijere, 1920
E. multiannulata Alexander, 1937
E. murudensis Edwards, 1926
E. nielseni de Meijere, 1921
E. nigripalpis de Meijere, 1913
E. nitidiuscula Alexander, 1920
E. oceanica Alexander, 1914
E. orbitalis Alexander, 1924
E. orientalis Brunetti, 1912
E. osceola Alexander, 1933
E. otayba Theischinger, 1994
E. palliclavata Alexander, 1936
E. pallidivena Alexander, 1938
E. parviclava Alexander, 1974
E. pederi Tjeder, 1969
E. perexquisita Alexander, 1978
E. peringueyi Bergroth, 1888
E. phoinix Savchenko, 1972
E. pila Alexander, 1966
E. polydonta Alexander, 1944
E. polytricha Alexander, 1945
E. pompalis Alexander, 1957
E. quadricincta Alexander, 1927
E. quadrihamata Savchenko, 1972
E. quinquecincta Alexander, 1927
E. rubripes Alexander, 1931
E. scolophora Alexander, 1973
E. scolostyla Alexander, 1962
E. seminole Alexander, 1933
E. septemtrionis Osten Sacken, 1860
E. setipennis Alexander, 1956
E. sexaculeata Alexander, 1940
E. sordida Zetterstedt, 1838
E. squalida Loew, 1871
E. straminea Osten Sacken, 1869
E. subchlorophylla Alexander, 1919
E. subfurcifer Alexander, 1929
E. subhalterata Alexander, 1960
E. subirrorata Alexander, 1920
E. susurra Alexander, 1945
E. tahanensis Edwards, 1928
E. tenuirama Savchenko, 1972
E. tordi Tjeder, 1973
E. transmarina Bergroth, 1889
E. trivittata Lindner, 1958
E. uliginosa Alexander, 1930
E. urania Alexander, 1944
E. verralli Edwards, 1921
E. vespertina Osten Sacken, 1860
E. villosa Osten Sacken, 1860
E. viridula Alexander, 1929
E. wellsae Theischinger, 1994
E. xanthoptera Alexander, 1924
E. yarraga Theischinger, 1994
E. yarto Theischinger, 1994
E. yukonensis Alexander, 1955

 Subgenus Hespererioptera Alexander, 1972
E. oregonensis Alexander, 1920
 Subgenus Lepidocyphona Alexander, 1972
E. rubia Alexander, 1914
 Subgenus Mesocyphona Osten Sacken, 1869

E. aglaia Alexander, 1945
E. albicapitella (Edwards, 1912)
E. apicinigra Alexander, 1927
E. bicinctipes Alexander, 1913
E. bievexa Alexander, 1967
E. bivittata (Loew, 1873)
E. caliptera Say, 1823
E. celestior Alexander, 1957
E. conica (Savchenko, 1972)
E. costalis Alexander, 1913
E. cynthia Alexander, 1946
E. diffusa Alexander, 1921
E. distincta Alexander, 1912
E. dulcis Osten Sacken, 1877
E. eiseni Alexander, 1913
E. euphrosyne Alexander, 1945
E. evergladea Alexander, 1933
E. factiosa Alexander, 1943
E. femoraatra Alexander, 1950
E. fossarum (Loew, 1873)
E. fuscodiscalis Alexander, 1938
E. gagneana Alexander, 1970
E. gulosa Alexander, 1943
E. histrio Alexander, 1945
E. immaculata  Alexander, 1913
E. incurvata Alexander, 1971
E. inornatipes Alexander, 1925
E. intercepta Alexander, 1947
E. invariegata Alexander, 1921
E. iquitosensis Alexander, 1946
E. knabi Alexander, 1913
E. latilimbata Alexander, 1970
E. leonensis Alexander, 1946
E. leucopasta Alexander, 1927
E. lilliputina (Savchenko, 1972)
E. maculosa (Edwards, 1912)
E. melanderiana Alexander, 1946
E. minuta (Lackschewitz, 1940)
E. modica Alexander, 1927
E. needhami Alexander, 1918
E. pachyrhampha Alexander, 1967
E. parva Osten Sacken, 1860
E. portoricensis Alexander, 1933
E. quadrifurcata Alexander, 1928
E. saturata Alexander, 1927
E. scabrifolia Alexander, 1967
E. serpentina Alexander, 1941
E. spinifera (Savchenko, 1972)
E. splendida Alexander, 1913
E. subcynthia Alexander, 1967
E. subdulcis Alexander, 1937
E. subhistrio Alexander, 1967
E. surinamensis Alexander, 1947
E. tantilla Alexander, 1916
E. testacea (Lackschewitz, 1964)
E. thalia Alexander, 1945
E. triangularis Alexander, 1945
E. troglodyta Edwards, 1918
E. turrialbae Alexander, 1945
E. venustipes Alexander, 1926
E. whitei Alexander, 1930
E. withycombei Alexander, 1930

 Subgenus Meterioptera Alexander, 1934

E. ablusa Alexander, 1958
E. angustifascia Alexander, 1920
E. bengalensis Alexander, 1921
E. beninensis Alexander, 1976
E. bicornifer Alexander, 1921
E. dewulfi Alexander, 1956
E. ensifera Alexander, 1930
E. fervida Alexander, 1934
E. festiva Alexander, 1934
E. fumipennis Alexander, 1921
E. geniculata Edwards, 1931
E. genualis Edwards, 1934
E. halterata Brunetti, 1912
E. illingworthi Alexander, 1920
E. insignis Edwards, 1916
E. javanensis de Meijere, 1911
E. luzonica Alexander, 1917
E. nigrospica Alexander, 1976
E. notata de Meijere, 1911
E. pergracilis Alexander, 1975
E. persinuata Alexander, 1964
E. quadripilata Alexander, 1958
E. quadrispicata Alexander, 1949
E. raphidostyla Alexander, 1978
E. scioptera Alexander, 1956
E. simulans Alexander, 1926
E. subaurea Bergroth, 1888
E. thaumasta Alexander, 1950
E. thelema Alexander, 1962

 Subgenus Tasiocerodes Alexander, 1958
E. cnephosa Alexander, 1966
E. nepalensis Alexander, 1957
E. persessilis Alexander, 1958
E. subsessilis Alexander, 1924
 Subgenus Teleneura Alexander, 1931
E. acanthapophysis Alexander, 1973
E. annandaleana Alexander, 1953
E. argentifrons Edwards, 1928
E. ctenophora Alexander, 1966
E. fusca de Meijere, 1913
E. laetipes Alexander, 1968
E. leucopoda Alexander, 1932
E. lushaiensis Alexander, 1966
E. luteiclavata Alexander, 1932
E. melanotaenia Alexander, 1931
E. nebulifera Alexander, 1953
E. nigribasis Edwards, 1928
E. parallela Brunetti, 1912
E. pennigera Alexander, 1954
E. perlugubris Alexander, 1940
E. perornata Alexander, 1934
E. subfusca Edwards, 1919
 Subgenus Teucherioptera Alexander, 1972
E. chrysocoma Osten Sacken, 1860
E. chrysocomoides Alexander, 1929
 Unplaced
E. amamiensis Alexander, 1956
E. balioptera Alexander, 1966
E. fuscoradialis Alexander, 1950
E. grumula Alexander, 1957
E. incerta Brunetti, 1912
E. incompleta Senior-White, 1922
E. paivai Alexander, 1927
E. perpictula Alexander, 1931
E. regina Alexander, 1959
E. rex Alexander, 1952
E. rhadinostyla Alexander, 1957
E. rogersi Alexander, 1923
E. tiro Alexander, 1954
 Uncertain (these additional species may have a subgenus)

E. armata Osten Sacken, 1859
E. armillaris Osten Sacken, 1869
E. asiatica Alexander, 1919
E. bipartita Osten Sacken, 1877
E. bispinigera Alexander, 1930
E. bispinosa 
E. bisulca Alexander, 1949
E. cana 
E. carsoni Alexander, 1955
E. chaetophora Alexander, 1968
E. churchillensis Alexander, 1938
E. cramptonella (Alexander, 1931)
E. denali Alexander, 1955
E. dorothea Alexander, 1914
E. ecalcar Alexander, 1949
E. empedoides 
E. estella Alexander, 1955
E. graphica Osten Sacken, 1859
E. grata Loew
E. hybrida (Meigen, 1804)
E. hygropetrica Alexander, 1943
E. indianensis Alexander, 1922
E. irata Alexander, 1949
E. laticeps Alexander, 1916
E. lucia Alexander, 1914
E. maria Alexander, 1948
E. mckinleyana Alexander, 1955
E. megarhabda (Alexander, 1943)
E. microcellula Alexander, 1914
E. neomexicana Alexander, 1929
E. nitida 
E. novaezemblae 
E. nubilosa Alexander, 1956
E. octobris Gavryushin, 2011
E. palomarica 
E. pauliani Seguy, 1960
E. peayi Alexander, 1948
E. pilipes 
E. platymera Alexander, 1968
E. polycantha Alexander, 1945
E. rainieria Alexander, 1943
E. recurva Alexander, 1949
E. sheldoni Alexander, 1955
E. shoshone Alexander, 1945
E. sinawava Alexander, 1948
E. sparsa Alexander, 1919
E. squamosa 
E. stictica Meigen
E. sunwapta Alexander, 1952
E. sweetmani Alexander, 1940
E. telfordi Alexander, 1948
E. tripartita 
E. venusta Osten Sacken, 1859
E. zukeli Alexander, 1940

References

Limoniidae
Nematocera genera